Anything Anything with Rich Russo is a weekly two-hour freeform radio program that airs on Sunday nights at 9 PM in the New York City market. The program's weekly playlists range from deep tracks of known artists, punk, non album b-sides, bubblegum pop, TV themes, jazz, blues, country, novelty and unsigned local artists. Dramarama’s "Anything, Anything (I'll Give You)" is the theme song and the Live at the China Club version begins 99% of the shows (occasionally an acoustic or piano version is played). The show has world premiered tracks by Bruce Springsteen, Green Day, and Tegan and Sara. fun.'s "We Are Young" had its first airing in October 2011 on Anything Anything with Rich Russo. The show has also had numerous guests including Andrew WK, Joan Jett, Mike Ness, Brandon Flowers, Jim James of My Morning Jacket, The Buried Life, Darryl "DMC" McDaniels, Girl in a Coma, Little Steven Van Zandt, Alejandro Escovedo, Steel Train, The Bangles, Urge Overkill, The Smithereens, Jesse Malin, Paul Collins, Garland Jeffreys, Lucero and Prima Donna.

Broadcast History
The show began on November 9, 2008 on WRXP-FM. Upon their sale and format switch in July 2011, the show began airing on WXPK-FM on September 25, 2011. On October 2, 2011 the show also began airing on WDHA-FM. On April 21, 2013, the show began airing on 820 AM The Gamut (WWFD) in Frederick, Maryland, WTOP 103.5 HD-3 in Washington, DC and 107.7 HD-3 WWWT-FM in Manassas, VA. On October 6, 2013, the show also began airing on WRAT in the Monmouth-Ocean NJ radio market. On March 16, 2014, the show also began airing on WLZX in the Springfield MA radio market. On September 6, 2015, the show began airing on WWSK in the Nassau-Suffolk Radio market. 

Stations currently airing Anything Anything include WXPK, WDHA, WRAT, WWSK, WMGM-FM, WMRQ-FM, WLZX-FM, WAQY, WMOS, WTKW, KTRX and WTOP-FM HD3.

Russo also hosts and curates The Jersey Guy Does Jersey on Sirius/XM's Little Steven's Underground Garage and also the Midnight Malfeasance on the same channel.

Influences
Host Rich Russo cites as his influences the following radio personalities and shows:

Rodney Bingenheimer (Rodney on the ROQ)
Dr. Demento (The Dr. Demento Show), who has appeared on the show 4 times as Super Bowl counterprogramming
John Peel (Peel Sessions)
Vin Scelsa (Idiot's Delight)
Nic Harcourt 
Little Steven Van Zandt (Little Steven's Underground Garage)
WFMU

Philosophies and Views

The anything anything year end charts:

Top 30 Songs of 2014
Top 20 albums of 2013
Top 30 Songs of 2013
Top 20 Best Covers of 2013
Top 12 albums of 2012
Top 36 Songs of 2012
Top 12 Cover Versions of 2012
Top 20 Albums of 2011

Rich's philosophies on bands and the music industry are covered on air and via his blog:

Why The Strokes Are A Waste of Time
What if the Presale Lays an Egg
Why Bon Jovi is Wrong about Steve Jobs
It's Really Bad Karma to Buy Music on Amazon
Why Don Kirshner Mattered
Why I Won't Ever Play 30 Seconds to Mars

Notable On-Air Events

August 30, 2009 Brandon Flowers of The Killers calls in and gives the show an exclusive live version of "A Dustland Fairytale" to play on the air.

February 28, 2010 Andrew WK was a guest in studio for the first ever extended broadcast of the show.

May 15, 2011 Darryl DMC McDaniels was a guest on the show. Rich read Sara Quin's entire letter about Tyler the Creator and there was spirited dialogue that followed.

October 9, 2011 As a tribute to the passing of Steve Jobs, Rich played only songs that began with the word "I" 

October 21, 2012 For John Wesley Harding's birthday Rich played an hour of his music 

July 28, 2013 As a tribute to Hoboken Music Venue Maxwell's closing, Rich only played songs that were recorded live at the club on his WDHA show 

Every Super Bowl Sunday since 2011, Dr. Demento serves as the co-host for a special all novelty edition show.

Notable Off Air Events

As an extension of the radio show, Russo began doing events with local unsigned bands on Staten Island, which then led to events in Brooklyn and New Jersey and then New York City.

An Anything Anything show at Santos Party House drew over 700 people for a group of unsigned bands and featured a guest appearance by Andrew WK for the encore.

Russo also hosted a series of residency shows with Jesse Malin at Bowery Electric.  Every show in the concert series sold out and featured guests including Billie Joe Armstrong from Green Day, Moby, and Eugene Hutz from Gogol Bordello

Anything Anything was given the exclusive on both Foxboro Hot Tubs (Green Day) shows to announce, promote and give away tickets.

A special secret show was held to celebrate Alejandro Escovedo’s appearance on Letterman; it sold out immediately and was featured in a write up in Rolling Stone by David Fricke.

November 2010, the Anything Anything 2nd Anniversary Show was featured in the gossip pages of the Daily News (due to Lady Gaga, Madonna and Joan Jett being in attendance).

For Record store day 2010, a special limited edition of 500 copies of live performances from the Anything Anything radio show featuring all unsigned local acts, sold 468 copies in one day and was the 68th best selling album of the week in the NY Market. There was an Anything Anything bus tour visiting local record stores that day and received local TV coverage. 100% of the profits of the record went directly to the record stores.

Russo serves as emcee with Vincent Pastore of the annual Light of Day concerts in Asbury Park, NJ where he has brought Bruce Springsteen on stage on two different occasions.

Russo also served as emcee with Vincent Pastore and Maureen Van Zandt at Little Kids Rock Benefit at Hammerstein Ballroom on October 20th, 2014, performers included Joan Jett, Alice Cooper, Cheap Trick, Billie Joe Armstrong, Mike Ness,  Darlene Love, Jake Clemons, Tommy James and Brody Dalle, 

The Anything Anything 4th Anniversary Party with Social Distortion at Starland Ballroom was cancelled due to Hurricane Sandy.

The Anything Anything 5th Anniversary Party with Tegan and Sara, Willie Nile and Plastiq Passion was on September 27th, 2013 at Starland Ballroom.

The Anything Anything 6th Anniversary Party Part 1 with Social Distortion, The Whigs and Jonny Two Bags was September 4th, 2014 at Starland Ballroom.

The Anything Anything 6th Anniversary Party Part 2 With Joan Jett and the Blackhearts and Jesse Malin was October 11, 2014 at the Count Basie Theatre.

The Anything Anything 8th Anniversary Party Part 2 with David Cassidy, The Battery Electric and Hell Yeah Babies was October 27, 2016 at the Count Basie Theatre

Reception and Reviews

Rich was voted the best DJ in the October 19–25, 2011 Village Voice Best of NYC Issue

References

External links
Anything Anything with Rich Russo, official site
Rolling Stone Magazine article about Bowery Ballroom concert presented by Anything Anything with Rich Russo
NJ.com interview with DJ/Host Rich Russo
Huffington Post article about Anything Anything with Rich Russo
Cranford Patch, interview with DJ and host Rich Russo
2010 interview with Rich Russo from the Staten Island Advance
Article about Record Store Day and independent music from 2010
Playlists from Anything, Anything with Rich Russo
Tegan and Sara sizzle, shimmer, and swoon at Starland

American music radio programs
Freeform (radio format)